The June 2007 Texas flooding occurred after heavy rains hit the Southern Plains of the United States. Moisture from the Gulf of Mexico flowed north creating a slow-moving frontal system. Approximately 200 millimeters (8 inches) of rain poured in northern Texas, and 2 flood-related deaths were reported.

Meteorological History

During mid-June, moisture from the Gulf of Mexico flowed north creating a slow-moving frontal system that caused heavy rains in southern parts of the United States. Approximately 200 millimeters (8 inches) of rain hit northern Texas. The rain fell on swollen streams and lakes as well as wet soil causing heavy flooding in parts of northern Texas. Marble Falls, one of the hardest hit areas, received 18 inches (460 mm) of rain in a period six hours. The headwaters of Lake Marble Falls and Lake Travis had 19 inches of rain totals recorded.

Damage

2 flood-related deaths were reported and approximately 300 homes were ordered to evacuate. Estimates of monetary damage caused by the storm exceed $50 million.[3]156 flash flood warnings were issued throughout the month, as well.

See also
2015 Texas–Oklahoma floods

References

External links
Summer Flood '07 Photo Gallery - KXAN
Summer Flood '07 Photo Gallery 2 - KXAN
Lake levels on the rise across Central Texas - KVUE
Marble Falls Residents Begin Cleanup - KEYE
Weather Damage Photo Gallery - KTBC
National Guard on the move in flooding response - News 8 Austin
Saturated Central Texas gets more rain - Houston Chronicle
No relief expected from Texas, Oklahoma rain - MSNBC
Rain Continues to Plague Flooded Texas - Associated Press
Youtube Playlist - June 2007 Floods
Floods in Texas and Oklahoma - NASA Earth Observatory

Natural disasters in Texas
Floods in Texas
2007 floods in the United States
Floods in the United States
2007 in Texas